Pamela J. Hunter is the Assembly member for the 128th District of the New York State Assembly. She is a Democrat. The district includes portions of Syracuse, as well as the surrounding towns of Salina, DeWitt, and Onondaga.

Life and career
Hunter was born and raised in upstate New York, and formerly served in the United States Army. Over the years, she has been significantly involved in a number of Syracuse-based charities, including the Syracuse Community Health Center, Home Aides of CNY, Catholic Charities.

In 2013, Hunter made her first foray into politics, running for and winning an At-Large seat on the Syracuse Common Council. She would serve as the Chair of the Public Safety Committee.

New York Assembly
In 2015, Assemblyman Samuel D. Roberts resigned to take a position with New York Governor Andrew Cuomo, and as a result a special election was called for his seat. Hunter soon after announced that she would pursue the seat, and in a three-way primary won the seat. She went on to win the three-way general election with a plurality.

Hunter was sworn into the seat on November 4, 2015.

References

External links
Assemblywoman Pamela Hunter official site

African-American state legislators in New York (state)
Living people
Democratic Party members of the New York State Assembly
Women state legislators in New York (state)
Politicians from Syracuse, New York
21st-century American politicians
21st-century American women politicians
Military personnel from Syracuse, New York
1969 births
21st-century African-American women
21st-century African-American politicians
20th-century African-American people
20th-century African-American women